Ten Thousand Fists is the third studio album by American heavy metal band Disturbed. It was released on September 20, 2005 and became Disturbed's second consecutive number 1 debut on the Billboard 200 in the United States, shipping around 239,000 copies in its opening week. It has been certified platinum by the RIAA and was also the band's second number 1 release in New Zealand. It is also the first Disturbed album to not have the Parental Advisory label.

Ten Thousand Fists marks the first album with bassist John Moyer who replaced Steve Kmak following his dismissal in 2003. However, Moyer was considered a session musician during the time of recording, and only became a full-time member during the tour supporting the album. It would be the band's third and final collaboration with mainstay producer Johnny K. In addition, Ten Thousand Fists is also the first album to feature their now-famous mascot The Guy on the cover; he would later appear full-bodied in the music video for the band's "Land of Confusion" cover.

Ten Thousand Fists is, as of 2010, Disturbed's second highest selling album in the United States, with sales of around 2 million copies. The Sickness, the band's debut CD, has shifted sales of almost 4.2 million copies in the United States. The album was dedicated to Dimebag Darrell, who was murdered the year before the album's release.

Promotion

On June 16, 2005, the album title was announced via the Disturbed website. Later that month, the album track listing was also revealed. The song "Guarded" was released to radio stations in late June 2005 as a teaser. Vocalist David Draiman said the motive behind releasing the song was to promote the album. He said, "[The song] was put out there to just whet everybody's appetite. It's one of the more aggressive tracks on the record, just to remind everybody where we came from and who we are."

The first single, "Stricken", was released on July 25, 2005. On August 19, 2005 the music video "Stricken", directed by Nathan Cox, was posted on the Warner Bros. Records website. The music video was filmed in an abandoned hospital, in the same location where some scenes from the 1984 horror film A Nightmare on Elm Street were filmed. In early August 2005, viral marketing was used to promote Ten Thousand Fists. A piece of software was sent via e-mail to certain recipients, who passed it along to other recipients. When the software was passed along to at least 250,000 recipients, it unlocked the song "Ten Thousand Fists". In early July 2006, the third single, "Land of Confusion" (originally written by Genesis), was released, alongside an animated music video directed by Todd McFarlane.

Style

The album features several styles, including nu metal, alternative metal, and hard rock. Some songs have been described as having "speed metal grooves".

Themes
Vocalist David Draiman said that Ten Thousand Fists "seems to fuse the brutality and darkness of The Sickness with the added melodic nature and complexity of Believe. It's more aggressive than the last record, and at times, more aggressive than the first one." The song "Overburdened" is about soldiers going to Hell. Draiman said that the song "Guarded" is about Draiman guarding himself from other people. He said the song "reflects what choosing this life forces certain people to do in a certain way — you have to remain guarded on a certain level." Draiman said the song "Ten Thousand Fists" is meant to "[signify] strength, unity, conviction, power, and the exhilaration that you feel when you get to see that at one of our shows." Draiman continued to say, "It's one of my favorite moments, and people know that I have an affinity for asking people to put their fists in the air, and it's just, it's exhilaration to be able to see ten thousand raised fists or more."

Political content
According to band members, while Ten Thousand Fists was not written as a political album, it was their most political record to date. Vocalist David Draiman's lyrics for the title song, "Ten Thousand Fists", were heavily influenced by his feelings towards American president George W. Bush, and several of the songs included war/anti-war themes, including "Deify", for which the intro features audio clips of Bush urging the nation to push forward in war, interlaced with an individual's political commentary, while the video for "Land of Confusion" depicts big business and capitalism as being a corrupting Nazi-style enemy being overthrown by an army of the people led by The Guy, the band's mascot.

Critical reception

Ten Thousand Fists earned mixed reviews from critics; it received a score of 59% on the review-aggregating website Metacritic, based on seven reviews. Allmusic reviewer Johnny Loftus gave the album a positive review; however, regarding the album's sound, he stated "Ten Thousand Fists does start to sound the same after a while." The Village Voice's reviewer Phil Freeman also gave the album a positive review, "The guitarist and drummer are an airtight team, and the session bassist capably underpins the guitar solos that are a welcome new addition to the band's sound. Program out the cover of 'Land of Confusion' and you've got the best mainstream metal release since Judas Priest's Angel of Retribution." NME gave it a 1/10 review describing it as "unfocused rage" and "you'll find nothing more despicable this year".

Accolades

Track listing

The UK and Tour editions of the album both feature four bonus tracks ("Monster", "Two Worlds", "Hell", and "Sickened"), the first of which was also included as an iTunes bonus track. All four songs are also included in the band's B-side compilation, The Lost Children.

Personnel
Disturbed
 David Draiman – vocals
 Dan Donegan – guitar, electronics
 Mike Wengren – drums, percussion

Session member
 John Moyer – bass guitar, backing vocals

Production
 Johnny K – producer
 Disturbed – producer, art direction
 Ben Grosse – mixing
 Paul Pavao – mixing assistant
 Ted Jensen – mastering
 Aiden Mullen – guitar technician
 Jeff Aldrich – A&R
 Ellen Wakayama – art direction
 Matt Taylor – art direction, design
 Todd McFarlane – artwork
 Greg Capullo – artwork
 Clay Patrick McBride – photography

Charts

Weekly charts

Year-end charts

Singles

Certifications

References

2005 albums
Albums produced by Johnny K
Disturbed (band) albums
Reprise Records albums